Rhododendron ovatum is an elepidote rhododendron species native to China and Taiwan. It is the type species for the subgenus, Azaleastrum.

References

Bibliography 

 The Plant List: Rhododendron ovatum
 Hirsutum.com

minus